Francis Fetherston or Fetherstonhaugh (born c. 1575) was an English politician who sat in the House of Commons from 1621 to 1624.

Fetherston was the son of John Fetherstonhaugh of Stanhope Hall, County Durham and his wife Margaret Radcliff daughter of Anthony Radcliff of Blanchland, Northumberland. He matriculated at Oriel College, Oxford on 11 July 1588, aged 13. He was a student of Gray's Inn in 1591. In 1621, he was elected Member of Parliament for New Romney. He was re-elected MP for New Romney in 1624.

References

1570s births
Year of death missing
Alumni of Oriel College, Oxford
Members of Gray's Inn
English MPs 1621–1622
English MPs 1624–1625